Shahvaar Ali Khan is a Pakistani writer, singer-songwriter and composer. His first single "No Saazish No Jang" is being touted as the official peace anthem by youth organisations across South Asia and America. In the peace anthem song, Shahvar has used the voices of Muhammad Ali Jinnah, Imran Khan, Benazir Bhutto, Mahatma Gandhi and Barack Obama. The song has also been especially well received by Pakistani, Indian, Bangladeshi and Nepali students from colleges like Harvard, Trinity, NYU and many other institutions abroad, in addition to assorted listeners in Pakistan and India

Shahvaar Ali Khan graduated in Economics & International Studies from Trinity College in Hartford Connecticut after attending Cambridge Rindge & Latin School, MA, USA.

After meandering from Investment Banking in New York to the Petroleum Industry in Pakistan the passion for music, entertainment, writing, an amalgamation of business acumen, people skills and penchant for creativity landed Shahvaar in Advertising. Shahvaar found the whole ad man lifestyle intriguing in the company of some extremely artistic peers and incisive clients, which helped him understand the pulse of the audience.  Concurrently, Shahvaar started singularly focusing on his Music, singing, songwriting/writing since 2008 and did a soft/viral internet availability of his first song "NO SAAZISH, NO JANG – Peace NOT Pieces" (NSNJ) on his website as an experiment.
 
Even without a Music Video-launching pad or a single advertising dollar spent on promoting NSNJ, Shahvaar found himself sharing a print space with the likes of Shahrukh Khan and Michael Jackson as Front Page news on many Pakistani and Indian Newspapers/Magazines including The News Instep, The Times of India (Delhi/Bombay Times), The Hindu, The Daily Jang, MSN India, Yahoo India, The Asian Age – Delhi, Mumbai, Kolkata, London, Deccan Chronicle, India, News Today, India, The Daily Siasat, India, USA Today, Hum Shehri (Urdu), Pakistan, India News (Hindi), Bombay Mid Day, Daily Pakistan (Urdu), etc. including a few Bollywood websites. However, despite the response, contrary to his expectations the struggle for Shahvaar had just begun. It took him close to two years to find the right concept and Director for his Music Video. In the meantime Shahvaar started writing for publications and opened his own Advertising Creative shop.

References 

<

External links 
 Music for peace  Pakistani singer-songwriter Shahvar Ali Khan's music is all about peace and unity
 ‘No Saazish, No Jung’ peace anthem from Pakistan
 The Hindu – Pak singer puts Gandhi, Jinnah together in appeal for peace
 No One Lives On "No Man's Land – by Shahvaar Ali Khan 
 Proud Lahori at Home in Bombay -Shahvaar Ali Khan
 Shahvar Ali Khan-No Saazish No Jung-Interview
 The Times of India – Shahvaar's sudden visit to India 
 The News on Sunday – Shahvaar Ali Khan, Hidden in the microcosm of music
 Interview With Shahvar Ali Khan, Published in The Saturday Post, Issue 194
 Shahvar Ali Khan-No Saazish No Jung, Calcutta Tube

Year of birth missing (living people)
Living people
Pakistani male singer-songwriters
Lahore Grammar School alumni
Musicians from Lahore
Punjabi people
21st-century Pakistani male singers